The Land Use Evolution and Impact Assessment Model (or LEAM) is a computer model developed
at the University of Illinois at Urbana-Champaign. LEAM is designed to simulate future land use
change as a result of alternative policies and development decisions. In recent years, LEAM has been used in combination with transportation and social cost models to better capture the effects land use has on transportation demand and social costs and vice versa.

History 

LEAM was first developed in the LEAMlab of the Department of Urban and Regional Planning at the
University of Illinois at Urbana-Champaign in the late 1990s with funding from the National Science Foundation. Its popularity with counties and regional agencies in Illinois led to technology licensing from the university and commercialization. In 2003, LEAMgroup was founded by professors Dr. Brian Deal and Dr. Varkki Pallathucheril. Since then, LEAM and its associated planning and decision support tools have been applied all around the U.S. and abroad.

Approach 

LEAM was developed to coordinate complex regional planning activities and aid in regionally-based
thinking, decision support, and policy establishment.

In LEAM, a region is represented as a 30x30-meter cell grid. A discrete-choice model controls whether
land use in each grid cell is transformed from its present state to a new state (residential, commercial, or industrial use) in a particular time step.

Several factors, or drivers, go into determining the likelihood of land use change. Drivers of change
include factors associated with each cell such as proximity to cities, employment centers, roads,
highways; slope; location within wetlands and floodplains; and characteristics of surrounding cells.
Whether or not a cell finally changes states is determined by its probability score and the scores of its
neighboring cells as well as a factor of chance.

LEAM results then serve as inputs to impact assessment models that determine the implications of land
use change on human, natural, and cultural systems. Some of these models include: transportation
demand, air quality, water quality and quantity, runoff pollution, habitat fragmentation, and utility and
infrastructure demand and cost.

See also
 UrbanSim

References

B. Deal, 2001. "Ecological Urban Dynamics: The Convergence of Spatial Modeling and Sustainability," The Journal of Building Research and Information 29(5): 381-393.

B. Deal, C. Farello, & B. Hannon, 2004. "A Dynamic Model of the Spread of an Infectious Disease: The Case of Fox Rabies in Illinois," in Landscape Simulation Modeling: A Spatially Explicit, Dynamic Approach R. Costanza and A. Voinov, eds. New York: Springer.

B. Deal and D. Fournier, 2000. "Ecological Urban Dynamics and Spatial Modeling," Proceedings of the American Council for an Energy Efficient Economy, Summer Study on Efficiency and Sustainability,
Monterey, CA.

B. Deal and V. Pallathucheril, 2009. "A Use-Driven Approach to Large-Scale Urban Modelling and Planning Support," in Planning Support Systems Best Practice and New Methods S. Geertman and J.C.H. Stillwell, eds. Springer Science+Business, pp. 29–51.

B. Deal and V.G. Pallathucheril, 2009. "Sustainability and Urban Dynamics: Assessing Future Impacts on Ecosystem Services," Sustainability 1: 346-362.

B. Deal and V.G. Pallathucheril, 2007. "Developing and Using Scenarios," in Engaging the Future: Forecasts, Scenarios, Plans, and Projects L.D. Hopkins and M.A. Zapata, eds. Cambridge, MA: Lincoln Institute of Land Policy.

B. Deal and D. Schunk, 2004. "Spatial Dynamic Modeling and Urban Land Use Transformation: A Simulation Approach to Assessing the Costs of Urban Sprawl," The Journal of Ecological Economics 51(1-2): 79-95.

B. Deal and Z. Sun, 2006. "A Spatially Explicit Urban Simulation Model: Landuse Evolution and Impact Assessment Model (LEAM)," in Smart Growth and Climate Change: Regional Development, Infrastructure and Adaptation M. Ruth, ed. Northampton, MA: Edward Elgar, pp. 181–203.

L.D. Hopkins, N. Kaza, & V.G. Pallathucheril, 2005. "A Data Model to Represent Plans and Regulations

in Urban Simulation Models," in GIS, Spatial Analysis, and Modeling D. Maguire, M. Batty, and M. Goodchild, eds. Redlands, CA: ESRI Press.

Z. Sun, B. Deal, and V.G. Pallathucheril, 2009. "The Land-use Evolution and Impact Assessment Model: A Comprehensive Urban Planning Support System," URISA: Journal of the Urban and Regional Information Systems Association 21(1): 57-68.

External links
 LEAM homepage

Scientific simulation software